The West and North African Athletics Championships was an international athletics competition between West and North African nations. It was held on one occasion in 1995 at the Stade Léopold Sédar Senghor in Dakar, Senegal. A reduced programme was held, focusing on the strengths of the regions' athletes. A total of 26 track and field events were contested, 16 for men and 11 for women. The men's 5000 metres, won by future world record holder Khalid Khannouchi, was the only long-distance event on the programme. The only throws on offer were shot put for men and women and a men's javelin throw. The host nation won the most events, with eight gold medals, followed by Nigeria and Morocco which won five events each. Burkina Faso and Cameroon were the only other nations to win an event. Ivorian sprinter Louise Ayétotché was the only athlete to win multiple events, taking the women's 200 metres and 400 metres titles.

Medal summary

Men

 † The men's 200 m was won by Antoine Boussombo, a guest athletes from Gabon, in a time of 21.39 seconds.

Women

References

1995 in athletics (track and field)
1995 in Senegal
1995 in African sport
Athletics competitions in Africa
Sports competitions in Dakar
Defunct athletics competitions
International athletics competitions
Sport in West Africa
Sport in North Africa